Dimitris Kaloskamis (born 1 March 2005) is a Greek footballer currently playing as a midfielder for Panathinaikos.

Club career
Kaloskamis first started playing football at an Arsenal soccer school in Chalandri, before trialling with Panathinaikos, Olympiacos and AEK Athens, eventually deciding to sign for the former in 2016. He signed his first professional contract in July 2021.

In September 2022, he was named by English newspaper The Guardian as one of the best players born in 2005 worldwide.

References

External links
 

2005 births
Living people
Greece youth international footballers
Association football midfielders
Panathinaikos F.C. players
Footballers from Athens
Greek footballers